Jori is a yadav village in the municipality of Farrukhnagar in the Gurgaon district of Haryana state in northern India.  According to the 2011 Census, the population is 3,063 persons in 620 households.

References

Villages in Gurgaon district